Neotanaidae is a family of crustaceans belonging to the order Tanaidacea.

Genera:
 Carololangia Gardiner, 1975
 Harpotanais Wolff, 1956
 Herpotanais Wolff, 1956
 Neotanais Beddard, 1886
 Venusticrus Gardiner, 1975

References

Tanaidacea
Crustacean families